Coronado is a village in the Artigas Department of northern Uruguay. Its name comes from Hipólito Coronado (1840-1876). Its main activity is horticultural production.

Geography
The village is located on the shores of the Uruguay River and shares borders with the south part of Bella Unión, forming a rural suburb of the city.

History
Coronado was established in 1885 with Campodónico and Franqui.

Population
In 2011 Coronado had a population of 438.
 
Source: Instituto Nacional de Estadística de Uruguay

References

External links
INE map of Bella Unión, Coronado, Las Piedras and Portones de Hierro y Campodónico

Populated places in the Artigas Department